Thinking of Empire is the second album by Slovenly, released on 1986 through SST Records.

Track listing

Personnel 
Slovenly
Steve Anderson – vocals
Rob Holtzman – drums
Lynn Johnston – bass clarinet, French Horn, viola
Tim Plowman – bass guitar, guitar
Tom Watson – guitar, bass guitar
Scott Ziegler – guitar, bass guitar
Production and additional personnel
Peter Slovenly – production
Spot – production

References 

1986 albums
Slovenly (band) albums
SST Records albums